Israel's Border Wars 1949–1956 is a 1993 book written by Benny Morris about the Arab infiltration from Egypt, Jordan, Lebanon and Syria into Israel after the 1948 Arab–Israeli War and before the 1956 Suez Crisis.

Morris contends that the Arab infiltration into Israel and the Israeli retaliatory response, including the 1952 raid on Beit Jala, that left four civilians dead, and the Qibya Massacre, that left at least 65 civilians dead, set patterns of behavior that were to characterize the Arab–Israeli conflict for decades to come.

See also
 1952 Beit Jala raid
 Qibya massacre
 Unit 101
 Reprisal operations

References
 Israel's Border Wars 1949–1956: Arab Infiltration, Israeli Retaliation, and the Countdown to the Suez War, (Oxford: Clarendon Press, 1993)

External links
 Benny Morris, Israel's Border Wars 1949-1956: Arab Infiltration, Israeli Retaliation, and the Countdown to the Suez War, 1997 edition  published by Oxford University Press. . No preview as of July 2022.

1993 non-fiction books
Books about the Arab–Israeli conflict